Chemosensory clusters are aggregates formed by a small number of chemoreceptor cells with characteristics similar to those found in the taste cells of the oropharyngeal cavity. The chemosensory clusters are similar to the taste buds but are smaller, resembling the developing taste buds. Chemosensory clusters are located in the larynx distally to the portion in which are present laryngeal taste buds and proximally to the region in which solitary chemosensory cells are found. Rarely, chemosensory clusters may be found in the distal portion of the airway. 

The elements forming the chemosensory clusters share common morphological and biochemical characteristics with the taste cells located in taste buds of the oropharyngeal cavity. In particular, they may express molecules of the chemoreceptorial cascade (e.g. trans-membrane taste receptors, the G-protein gustducin, PLCbeta2, IP3R3, TRPM5). Usually, in chemosensory cluster a true "taste pore" is lacking.

To date, the functional role of the chemosensory clusters is unknown.

See also
Diffuse chemosensory system
Solitary chemosensory cells

References

Gilbertson TA, Damak S, Margolskee RF. The molecular physiology of taste transduction. Curr Opin Neurobiol 2000; 10: 519–27.
Margolskee RF. Molecular mechanisms of bitter and sweet taste transduction. J Biol Chem 2002; 277:1–4.
Sbarbati A., Merigo F, Benati D, Tizzano M, Bernardi P, Osculati F. Laryngeal chemosensory clusters. Chem Senses 2004b; 29:683-92.

Sensory systems